Following is a list of justices of the Montana Supreme Court.

Current members

Former members

Chief justices

Montana Territorial Supreme Court

Montana Supreme Court

Associate justices

Montana Territorial Supreme Court

Montana Supreme Court

References

Montana
Justices